Shopiere is an unincorporated community and census-designated place in the Town of Turtle, in Rock County, Wisconsin, United States. It was first named a CDP at the 2020 census, which showed a population of 154.

History
The community was originally named Waterloo. The first settlement was made in the 1830s by a colony from Connecticut. The present name is derived from chaux pierre, French for limestone, which is abundant in the area.

Demographics

Notable people
 The community was the last home of Louis P. Harvey, the short-lived governor of Wisconsin, who drowned bringing medical supplies to wounded troops near the Civil War Battle of Shiloh in 1862.
 Loretta C. Van Hook (1852-1935), missionary and educator

Notes

Unincorporated communities in Rock County, Wisconsin
Unincorporated communities in Wisconsin
1830s establishments in Wisconsin Territory
Census-designated places in Rock County, Wisconsin
Census-designated places in Wisconsin